Dolphin Entertainment, Inc. is an American entertainment marketing and production company that is located in Coral Gables, Florida. It was founded in 1996 by CEO Bill O’Dowd. Dolphin produces children and young adult-targeted television shows and movies.

Corporate history
The Dolphin Entertainment-produced Nickelodeon television show Zoey 101 was nominated for an "Outstanding Children's Program" Emmy in 2005, with Dolphin's Bill O'Dowd serving as executive producer.

In March 2021, Dolphin Entertainment "formed a new division dedicated to designing, producing, releasing and promoting NFTs for the company and its clients, within the film, TV, music, gaming, foods and technology industries."

In August 2021, Dolphin Entertainment announced a partnership with West Realm Shire Services, owner and operator of FTX.US, to create an NFT marketplace for major sports and entertainment brands.

In March 2022, Dolphin Entertainment entered into a strategic partnership with The Flower Girls, a fine art NFT collection by artist Varvara Alay.

Acquisitions

Company filmography
This includes:
Films
 Break-In (2006)
 Vanished (2006)
 Stranded (2006)
 Christmas in Paradise (2007)
 Shredderman Rules (2007)
 The Last Day of Summer (2007)
 Roxy Hunter and the Mystery of the Moody Ghost (2007)
 Roxy Hunter and the Secret of the Shaman (2008)
 Roxy Hunter and the Myth of the Mermaid (2008)
 Gym Teacher: The Movie (2008)
 The Unquiet (2008)
 Roxy Hunter and the Horrific Halloween (2008)
 Spectacular! (2009)
 What's Up Warthogs! (2010)
 Justin Bieber's Believe (2013)
 Max Steel (2016)

Series
 Ocean Ave. (2002–2003)
 Ned's Declassified School Survival Guide (2004–2007)
 Zoey 101 (2005–2008)
 Tower Prep (2010)
 Aim High (2011–2013)
 H+: The Digital Series (2012–2013)
 Raising Expectations (2016–2018)

References

External links
 

Film production companies of the United States
Companies based in Miami-Dade County, Florida
Mass media companies established in 1996